In previous years, the cyclists had been divided in two classes, the sponsored class and the unsponsored class. For the 1923 Tour de France, this system changed, and three categories were used: the "first category", of the top cyclist, the "second category", of lesser but still sponsored cyclists, and the touriste-routiers, the quasi-amateurs.

The sponsors, who had joined forces in the previous tours under the name La Sportive, were now financially stable enough to have their own teams. Automoto, sponsor of the team with the Pélissier brothers, had commercial interests in Italy, so wanted to have Italian cyclists in the team. Several Italian cyclists were hired, who were supposed to come to France. Only one Italian cyclist showed up, Ottavio Bottecchia, who had started as a professional the year before. The sponsor then decided that the marketing plan would not work with only one Italian cyclist, and wanted to send him back. At the last minute, Bottecchia was allowed to stay on the team.

By starting number

By nationality

References

1923 Tour de France
1923